Naharnet is one of the first Lebanese online media after An Nahar newspaper was online in September 1995. It was launched in September 2000. At its initial phase it was a portal and virtual community for Lebanese and Arabs everywhere.

Naharnet quickly grew to become one of the leading portals in the Lebanese market and diaspora spreading over 220 countries. It provides news, information, entertainment, mobile and social networking services.

Naharnet currently focuses on providing real-time political news and information about Lebanon and the Middle East, in English and Arabic.

Naharnet is not affiliated in any way with newspaper An Nahar.

References 

Lebanese news websites
Middle Eastern news websites
Internet properties established in 2000
2000 establishments in Lebanon
Arabic-language websites
English-language websites
Asian news websites